Play the Right Thing is an album by jazz saxophonist Lou Donaldson, his first recording for the Milestone label, featuring Donaldson with Lonnie Smith, Peter Bernstein, Bernard Purdie, and Ralph Dorsey.

Reception
The album was awarded 3 stars in an Allmusic review by Richard S. Ginell who states "As specifically indicated by the album's title, the title tune's bluesy cast, and Sweet Lou Donaldson's own determined liner notes, this CD aims to strike a blow for soul-jazz, a once-popular, then-maligned idiom newly returned from exile. That it does — with no frills, no apologies, and an idiomatic supporting cast... the CD achieves a comfortable level of competence without really grabbing hold of a groove and riding it the way Donaldson could in his Blue Note days".

Track listing
All compositions by Lou Donaldson except as indicated
 "Play the Right Thing" - 6:24  
 "Whiskey Drinkin' Woman" - 6:05  
 "Marmaduke" (Charlie Parker) - 6:47  
 "Harlem Nocturne" (Earle Hagen, Dick Rogers) - 5:50  
 "This is Happiness" (Tadd Dameron) - 7:55  
 "I Had the Craziest Dream" (Mack Gordon, Harry Warren) - 6:24  
 "The Masquerade is Over" (Herbert Magidson, Allie Wrubel) - 4:15  
 "Footpattin' Time" - 6:07  
Recorded in New York City on December 19 & 29, 1990 by Malcolm Addey.

Personnel
Lou Donaldson - alto saxophone, vocals
Lonnie Smith - organ
Peter Bernstein - guitar
Bernard Purdie - drums
Ralph Dorsey - congas

References

Lou Donaldson albums
1991 albums
Milestone Records albums